The Adamson House and its associated land, which was known as Vaquero Hill in the 19th century, is a historic house and gardens in Malibu, California. The residence and estate is on the coast, within Malibu Lagoon State Beach park.

It has been called the "Taj Mahal of Tile" due to its extensive use of decorative ceramic tiles created by Rufus Keeler of Malibu Potteries. The house was built in 1929 for Rhoda Rindge Adamson and Merritt Huntley Adamson, based on a Mediterranean Revival design by Stiles O. Clements of the architectural firm of Morgan, Walls & Clements. The Adamson House was designated as California Historical Landmark No. 966 around 1977, and added to the National Register of Historic Places circa 1985.

History

Rindge-Adamson family
Frederick Hastings Rindge was a wealthy Boston businessman who relocated to Los Angeles, and owned the "Rindge Ranch," which included the historic Spanish land concession Rancho Topanga Malibu Sequit, enlarged by subsequent land purchases surrounding the ranch. The Rindge Ranch thus encompassed present day Malibu, California, and small portions of the Santa Monica Mountains. His daughter was Rhoda Agatha Rindge Adamson.

Merritt Adamson (1888–1949) was a graduate of the University of Southern California Law School and was the captain of the 1912 football team, the first USC team to be known as the "Trojans."  Adamson met Rhoda Rindge while he was employed as the foreman of the Rindge Ranch. Rhoda Rindge reportedly became interested in him when she helped to nurse him back to good health after he was injured in an accident. The couple was married in 1915. In 1916 Adamson established a dairy business in the San Fernando Valley, in Tarzana known as Adohr Farms, the name representing his wife's name spelled backwards.  The business became one of the country's largest dairies, operating one of the largest herds of Guernsey cows in the world.

Construction and architecture

The two-story, ten-room Adamson House was designed by Stiles O. Clements and built of steel-reinforced concrete.  Completed in 1930, Stiles called the house an outstanding example of modified Mediterranean Revival-style architecture.  Architectural historians refer to the style as a synthesis of Spanish Colonial Revival and Moorish Revival architecture.
The house features teak woodworking, fireplaces in several interior and outdoor patio rooms, handpainted ceilings, lead-framed bottle glass windows, and "wrought-iron filigrees fitting over the windows like intricate jewelry."  The main floor is dominated by a large living room with windows on three sides.  The room is still furnished as it was when the Adamsons lived there, including the large radio on which the family received news of the attack on Pearl Harbor.  Other rooms on the main floor include a guest bedroom with a bathroom that is tiled literally from floor to ceiling, a dining room with an old convent table overlooking the ocean, a kitchen with an early version of a dishwasher and a colorful tiled clock, and the main entrance with its imposing wood door and tiled entrance table.

There are four bedrooms and a small kitchenette upstairs. The master bedroom, where Mr. and Mrs. Adamson slept, is on the southwest corner of the house. It has a large tiled bathroom, and Mrs. Adamson's clothes and hat collection remain in her closet. Next to the master bedroom is the one designed for the Adamsons' son; its bathroom has detailed tiles depicting ships and nautical scenes. The girls' bedroom in the center facing the ocean has a tremendous view of the ocean and coast. These three bedrooms open onto a large upstairs patio with the home's most spectacular panoramic view of the ocean, the Malibu lagoon and the coast in both directions. The fourth bedroom upstairs is at the eastern end of the second floor and looks out of a large Dombeya tree that blooms with spectacular bright red flowers in the spring.

Another striking feature of the house is the tiled swimming pool set into the sand that was equipped with a special filtering and heating apparatus that permitted the pool to be filled with either salt or freshwater.  The Los Angeles Times in 1930 noted that the unusual features made the "plunge one of the finest in the southland."

A tile showcase

Adamson House is best known for its extensive use of locally produced Malibu tile. In 1926, May K. Rindge (Rhonda Rindge Adamson's mother) established a tileworks east of the Malibu Pier. The factory was run by Rufus Keeler, an innovative ceramic engineer, who worked with local artisans to design decorative art tile, employing more than 100 persons in the late 1920s and creating "some of the most colorful and inventive glazed tiles in the country."  Hand-crafted art tile fired from local clay was specially designed for each room of the Adamson House.  Even the ceiling of one of the bathrooms was tiled. In 1930, the Los Angeles Times reported: "Striking tile effects have been obtained from original designs of the craftsmen and artists of the pottery and floors, walls and patios."  Sixty-seven years later, the Los Angeles Times was still writing about the home's extraordinary tilework: "This huge Spanish-style mansion, built in 1929 (sic), might as well be called the house that tile built. Tile is everywhere — from the ceramic wall clock above the tile-topped oak table in the kitchen to the floor-to-ceiling tiled bathrooms."

One of the home's most popular examples of tilework is a  imitation Persian carpet made of tile, including small pieces designed to look like rug fringes.  In the exterior of the house, the colorfully tiled Neptune Fountain, Peacock Fountain and Star Fountain are among the home's most photographed examples of tilework.  Nearby, there is also an elaborately tiled outdoor tub used by the Adamsons to bathe their dogs. The bathhouse and swimming pool are also covered with Malibu tile, and the dressing rooms have tiled showers with decorative motifs.  The house has been called a "museum of tile" and the "Taj Mahal of Tile." The Malibu Potteries only operated for six years from 1926–1932, and the Adamson House has many of the potteries' most significant remaining works.

Early use
The house was originally a vacation beach cottage, but the Adamsons eventually made it their permanent home. In December 1932, a fire started in the electrical wiring of the garage. One of the bedrooms was badly damaged, and the entire house was threatened by intense flames. The fire was extinguished by pumping crews from the forestry stations at Fernwood and Las Flores, aided by the Malibu Beach colony fire department. During World War II, the bathhouse was used by the United States Coast Guard as a local headquarters to watch out over the Malibu coast.

Eminent domain and plans for beach parking

After the death of her husband, Rhoda Rindge Adamson continued to live in the house until her own death in April 1962.  After her death, her heirs announced plans to build a $10–12 million "deluxe Waikiki-type beach resort" on the  site, while preserving the house as an art and history museum.  The State of California, however, filed an eminent domain lawsuit in 1966, seeking to raze the house and turn it into beach parking.  The state won its eminent domain lawsuit and purchased the property from the Adamson estate at the $2.69 million valuation set by the court.

Preservation as a museum

Despite the state's victory in the eminent domain proceeding, the Malibu Historical Society, supported by the Los Angeles County Department of Parks and Recreation and the Adamson family, together with other leading Malibu citizens, fought over the next ten years to have the Adamson House preserved.  While the state's plans to raze the house were put on hold, the house was leased to Pepperdine University from 1971-1982 as the residence of the university's chancellor, Norvel Young. In addition to its extensive use of Malibu tile, preservationists touted the house as "a prime example of California Moorish-Spanish architecture." In 1976, preservationists won a victory when Herbert Rhodes, the director of the state's Department of Parks and Recreation, overruled staff recommendations to use the land for beach parking and recommended preservation of the entire property.

Sylvia Rindge Adamson Neville, a granddaughter of Frederick Rindge, donated money to help restore the house, and additional funds were raised by the Malibu Historical Society. Beginning in October 1982, volunteers from the Malibu Lagoon State Beach Interpretive Association began work converting the garage into a small historic museum.  In 1983, the house and Malibu Lagoon Museum (located in the garage) were opened to the public for docent-led tours.  The house is open to the public for tours on Wednesdays through Saturdays from 11 a.m. to 3 p.m.

While the house is looked after by a dedicated staff of state employees and volunteers, a lack of funding from the state has led to maintenance problems as of September 2008. The area beneath the upstairs balcony overlooking the ocean shows signs of deterioration. A large iron barbecue grill that was a gift from Will Rogers to the Adamson family had been left exposed to the elements and is in need of repair. Several tile-topped tables that formerly sat in the backyard have been vandalized and now sit in an enclosed area.

Pop culture

In 1975, the home was featured in the Mannix episode "A Word Called Courage." 
 From 1987 through 1989, the home was featured in seasons eight and ten of Knots Landing, serving as Abby Ewing's house.
In 2020, the Adamson House was featured in the Netflix show Ratched.

Historic designations

In October 1977, the house was listed on the National Register of Historic Places.  And in November 1985, it was also designated as a California Historical Landmark by the California Historic Resources Commission.

The California Historical Landmark Marker NO. 966 at the site reads:
NO. 966 ADAMSON HOUSE AT MALIBU LAGOON STATE BEACH - Designed by Stiles O. Clements in 1929, this Spanish Colonial Revival home contains the best surviving examples of decorative ceramic tile produced by Malibu Potteries. During its short existence from 1926 to 1932, Malibu Potteries made an outstanding contribution to ceramic art in California through its development and production of a wide range of artistic and colorful decorative tile. The home was built for Merritt Huntley Adamson and Rhoda Rindge Adamson, daughter of Frederick Hastings Rindge and May Knight Rindge, last owners of the Rancho Malibu Spanish grant.

See also
Malibu Creek
Rindge Dam
Frederick Hastings Rindge House
Frederick Roehrig
List of Registered Historic Places in Los Angeles County, California
History of the National Register of Historic Places
Hueneme, Malibu and Port Los Angeles Railway (The railroad that the Rindges built through Malibu)

References

External links

 Official Adamson House website

Houses in Los Angeles County, California
Buildings and structures in Malibu, California
Historic house museums in California
Museums in Malibu, California
Open-air museums in California
Gardens in California
Houses completed in 1930
California Historical Landmarks
Houses on the National Register of Historic Places in California
Buildings and structures on the National Register of Historic Places in Los Angeles County, California
1930 in California
History of Los Angeles County, California
Santa Monica Mountains
1930s architecture in the United States
Morgan, Walls & Clements buildings
Mediterranean Revival architecture in California
Moorish Revival architecture in California
Spanish Colonial Revival architecture in California